The Busby Railway is a short railway line built on the south side of Glasgow, connecting the (at the time) small villages of Thornliebank, Giffnock, Clarkston and Busby and later Thorntonhall and East Kilbride with the city. It opened in two stages, in 1866 and 1868, and served industry and encouraged residential development.

The line is still open as part of the Glasgow South Western Line on the city's suburban rail network.

History
In the 1860s, developing residential areas outside the immediate conurbation of Glasgow began to emerge. Local people promoted a line to connect Busby to the growing Glasgow network, and on 11 May 1863 the Busby Railway obtained an authorising Act of Parliament with a capital of £36,000. It was to run from a junction with the Glasgow, Barrhead and Neilston Direct Railway (GB&NDR) which at that time was leased to, and worked by, the Caledonian Railway. The line would be 3 miles 43 chains (6 km) in length. The speculative nature of the line was indicated in the prospectus, which described the area served as being ideal for villa residences: business people could live in rural surroundings and travel daily to their places of business in the City. There was also important quarrying activity in the area; their product was much in demand at the time; there were also textile mills in the area served.

The line opened on 1 January 1866, and the point of junction with the main line was named Busby Junction. Train services operated from the South Side station in Glasgow. There was a half mile goods branch to a print works at Busby.

During the construction period the decision was taken to extend the line to the village of East Kilbride, at an additional cost of £45,000. The Caledonian Railway subscribed one-third of this sum. The extension was opened on 1 September 1868.

In 1881 the line was doubled between Busby Junction and Busby.

On 18 July 1881 an Act was passed authorising the Caledonian Railway to absorb the Busby Railway, and in December 1881 it was determined to buy out the remaining shareholders of the Busby Railway Company, and the line passed fully into Caledonian Railway ownership on 2 February 1882. The Caledonian Railway built a line eastwards from East Kilbride to join the Strathaven line near High Blantyre, where there was considerable mining activity; the intervening land was very thinly populated.

When the Lanarkshire and Ayrshire Railway (L&AR) line was opened between Cathcart and Neilston in 1903 a south curve connection was built so that trains could run direct from Blantyre via East Kilbride and Neilston (High) to Ardrossan. The junction on the Busby line was Clarkston East Junction. The intention was to shorten the mileage for mineral trains, but this only lasted for nine months, until the opening of the section of the L&AR from Newton to Cathcart, when nearly all of the mineral traffic ran that way. The Clarkston curve then had very little traffic, and it was closed on 29 October 1907. Clarkston East Junction remained in use as a block post on the Busby line until 1930.

Around the end of the nineteenth century the industrial activity on the line declined, but residential travel increased considerably.

East Kilbride transformed from a village to a New Town from 1947 onward, and this gave new significance to the branch line. However the station, located to suit the core of the earlier village, was not well placed for the centre of the New Town, and there have been numerous initiatives to extend the railway accordingly. None of these has been implemented, and the dispersed nature of the community's housing, and changing travel habits, mean that the station serves better now as a railhead, than as a terminal to which people might walk, and at present, while there is no active proposal to extend, preparatory work began in 2021 for the electrification of the line and its reconstruction with double track throughout.

Train service
The initial passenger train service on the line was three trains each way with an extra train on Saturday. The trains used the GB&NDR terminus at South Side in Glasgow. When that closed in 1877, the trains used Gorbals on the Glasgow, Barrhead and Kilmarnock Joint Railway extension to St Enoch as a temporary arrangement, until in June 1879 they transferred to the new Glasgow Central station.

At the present day there is a half-hourly interval passenger service on the line, operated by Class 156 diesel multiple units.

Topography
Busby Junction to Busby opened on 1 January 1866; Busby to East Kilbride opened on 1 September 1868; the line is open at the present day. The altitude of East Kilbride station is 504 feet (154 m).

The line is double track from Busby Junction to Busby, and then single to East Kilbride; there is a passing loop ("Hairmyres Loop") immediately on the East Kilbride side of Hairmyres station.

Entries in italics were not passenger stations; entries in bold are open today.

 Busby Junction; junction from Glasgow on the GB&NDR line;
 Thornliebank; opened 1 October 1881; note: there had earlier been a station of the same name on the Spiersbridge branch;
 Giffnock;
 Clarkston; renamed Clarkston and Stamperland between 1952 and 1973;
 Busby;
 Eaglesham Road; renamed Thornton Hall 1877; renamed Thorntonhall 1944;
 Hairmyres; opened 1 September 1868;
 East Kilbride.

Clarkston curves
The configuration of the curves at Clarkston is complex. The Busby Railway line runs south-east to north-west and the later L&AR line runs south-west to north-east. The south curve as described above is shown as in situ but disconnected at both ends on an Ordnance Survey map dated 1911; the junction at the Neilston end is named Clarkston West Junction and the signal box at the Clarkston end is Clarkston East Junction; this is in addition to Clarkston station signal box. An east curve, not referred to by Paterson, is also shown, and is also disconnected at the Clarkston end; it is likely it was never connected as a through route. It ran parallel with the L&AR line and joined it at Muirend station: in effect this was a long siding from Muirend, and was used for wagon storage.

References

Standard gauge railways in Scotland
Transport in East Renfrewshire
Transport in South Lanarkshire
Caledonian Railway
Railway lines opened in 1866